Masami Miyamoto (born 2 September 1934) is a Japanese diver. She competed in two events at the 1952 Summer Olympics.

References

External links
 
 

1934 births
Living people
Japanese female divers
Olympic divers of Japan
Divers at the 1952 Summer Olympics
Place of birth missing (living people)
Asian Games medalists in diving
Divers at the 1954 Asian Games
Divers at the 1958 Asian Games
Medalists at the 1954 Asian Games
Medalists at the 1958 Asian Games
Asian Games gold medalists for Japan
Asian Games silver medalists for Japan
20th-century Japanese women